Whangaokeno / East Island is a small island approximately  east of East Cape in the North Island of New Zealand. However, the island is prone to earthquakes and its steep cliffs cause numerous landslides. By 1920, the danger to the lighthouse was considered great enough to trigger a decision to move the lighthouse to the mainland. In 1922, the lighthouse was extinguished and relocated to its current position.

On 10 June 2019, the name of the island was officially gazetted as Whangaokeno / East Island.

The Takitimu waka landed at Whangaōkena (East Cape).

See also

 New Zealand outlying islands
 List of islands of New Zealand
 List of islands
 Desert island

References

Uninhabited islands of New Zealand
Landforms of the Gisborne District